is a town located in Ikoma District, Nara Prefecture, Japan.

As of November 1, 2017, the town has a population of 23,185 people, 10,985 males and 12,200 females and a density of 2,640 persons per km². There is a total of 10,407 households. The total area is 8.79 km².

Geography 
Located in western Nara Prefecture, sitting right next to the border with Osaka Prefecture, the Yamato River flows through. The majority of the land is flat, as like other municipalities in the Nara Basin. However, the Ikoma Mountain Range situated in the western portion of the town, on the border between Osaka Prefecture.

Sister cities

In Japan 
 Misato, Saitama
 Azumino, Nagano (former Misato village)

Transportation

Rail 
West Japan Railway Company
Kansai Main Line (Yamatoji Line):  Sangō Station
Kintetsu Railway
Ikoma Line: Seya-Kitaguchi Station - Shigisanshita Station

Road 
Japan National Route 25
Japan National Route 168

References

External links 

  

Towns in Nara Prefecture